Brandon Smith (March 12, 1992 – November 17, 2022), known professionally as B. Smyth, was an American hip hop and R&B recording artist from Fort Lauderdale, Florida.

Early life
Smith was born in Fort Lauderdale, Florida. He started out his career by posting his own covers of popular songs on YouTube, including "Stay" by Rihanna and "Quickie" by Miguel, in which some of his covers he posted have received over 500,000 views. His videos led to him performing at various high-profile talent shows, where his style drew comparisons to prominent artists Chris Brown and Usher.

Career
Smyth's success at talent shows landed him a recording contract with Motown in 2012. He released his debut single, "Leggo" featuring 2 Chainz, on December 11, 2012. The song peaked at No. 41 on the Hot R&B Songs list and No. 20 on the Bubbling Under Hot 100 Singles list.

Smyth released his first EP, The Florida Files, on October 15, 2013, featuring his second single, "Win Win" featuring Future. The song was produced by Mike Will Made It and Pluss.

Smyth switched record labels from Motown to ByStorm Entertainment and RCA Records. On December 4, 2015, he released his first single with ByStorm and RCA, "Creep" featuring Young Thug. The song was produced by Dun Deal.

Death
Smyth died from pulmonary fibrosis on November 17, 2022, at the age of 30.

Discography

Extended plays

Singles

Notes

References

External links

1992 births
2022 deaths
African-American male rappers
Motown artists
Musicians from Fort Lauderdale, Florida
American contemporary R&B singers
21st-century American rappers
American male pop singers
21st-century American male musicians
Pop rappers
21st-century African-American musicians
Rappers from Florida
Deaths from pulmonary fibrosis